Hoya multiflora is a species of tropical plants in the family Apocynaceae. It is native to China and tropical Asia. It is an evergreen perennial plant with a maximum height of 50 centimeters. This plant can produce nectar.

References

External links
 

multiflora
Flora of China
Flora of Indo-China
Flora of Malesia
Plants described in 1823
House plants